= Cool Spring, Virginia =

Unincorporated community in Virginia, United States

Coordinates: 36°50′03″N 77°49′33″W

Cool Spring is an unincorporated community located in Brunswick County, in the U.S. state of Virginia.
